The 2021 World TeamTennis season was the 46th season of the top professional team tennis league in the United States.

All matches were held at the Indian Wells Tennis Garden in California. 

This season included five teams. Four teams that competed in 2020 (Philadelphia Freedoms, Vegas Rollers, Orlando Storm and Washington Kastles), did not participate this year due to the revised format and the inability to host home matches, but are expected to return in the 2022 season.

The Orange County Breakers won their third King Trophy as WTT champions with a 21–13 win over the Springfield Lasers in the WTT Finals.

Competition format
Each team played a 12-match regular-season schedule. The matches consisted of five sets, with one set each of men's and women's singles, men's and women's doubles, and mixed doubles. The first team to reach five games won each set. A nine-point tiebreaker was played if a set reaches four games all. One point was awarded for each game won and scoring was cumulative. If necessary, Extended Play and a super tiebreaker were played to determine the winner of the match. The top two teams in the regular season will qualify for the WTT Finals on November 28. The winner of this final will be awarded the King Trophy.

Teams and players
* = Player competed for the full season.

Standings
The top two teams qualified for the 2021 WTT Finals.

Results table
Color Key: Win  Loss - Reference:

Statistical leaders
The table below shows the WTT teams and players with the highest regular-season winning percentages in each of the league's five events.

Note: Only players who played in at least 40% of their team's total number of games in a particular event are considered. (Overall at least 30% of team's total games.)

WTT Finals

Match summary

See also

 Team tennis

References

External links
 Official website

World TeamTennis seasons
World TeamTennis season
World TeamTennis